Romanorum may refer to :

The Corpus Agrimensorum Romanorum, a Roman treatise on land surveying. 
Liber Diurnus Romanorum Pontificum, Latin for Journal of the Roman Pontiffs, is the name given to a miscellaneous collection of ecclesiastical formulae used in the Papal chancery until about the 11th century.
Gesta Romanorum, a Latin collection of anecdotes and tales, was probably compiled about the end of the 13th century or the beginning of the 14th. 
The Imperator Romanorum (disambiguation), or Roman Emperor, ruler of the Roman State during the imperial period. 
Providas Romanorum was an Apostolic constitution promulgated by Pope Benedict XIV on May 18, 1751. 
Rex Romanorum was the title used by the elected ruler of the Holy Roman Empire.